Mount of Temptation, in Palestinian Arabic , is a mountain over the town of Jericho in the Judean Desert, in the West Bank. Ancient Christian tradition identifies it as the location of the temptation of Jesus described in the New Testament Gospels of Matthew, Mark, and Luke, in which it is said that, from "a high place", the Devil offered Jesus rule over all the kingdoms of the world.

Since at least the 4th century, Christian tradition has specifically associated the forty days of Jesus's fasting that preceded his temptation with a cave on Jebel Quruntul. Eventually, it came to be associated with the high mountain in the Gospel's description of temptation. 

Quruntul had previously been the location of a Seleucid and Maccabean fortress known as Dok (also Doq and Dagon), which was the site of the assassination of Simon Maccabeus and two of his sons in 134. 

Centuries after the death of Jesus, the Mount became the site of a lavra-type monastery, turned into a Catholic monastery during the era of the Crusades, and then into an Orthodox monastery since the late Ottoman period. Since 1998, the monastery halfway up the mountain has been connected with the tell holding the remains of ancient Jericho via a cable car and a center of religious tourism. In 2014, the mountain and monastery were made part of the State of Palestine's "Jericho Oasis Archaeological Park". It has also been nominated to the Tentative List for World Heritage status as part of religious traditions of El-Bariyah, the Judaean Desert.

Names

Related to the Gospels
All three passages where this is mentioned are traditionally translated into English as "the wilderness", although the same term is variously rendered in other locations in the Bible as a "secluded place", a "solitary place", or "the desert". On the Crusader-period Uppsala Map of Jerusalem, it appears as "mons excelsus", literally "high mountain" (see here, top right quadrant).

When this passage was connected to a specific hill in late Antiquity, it was eventually given the name  (etc), after the 40-day period mentioned in the biblical accounts,  being a Late Latin form of classical  ("forty"). 

The name , later Mount of Temptation, was first attested in English in 1654. 

Related to the ancient fortress
The Hebrew name of the Maccabean fortress on this hill is not separately recorded but was transliterated into Greek as Dōk in 1 Maccabees and as Dagṑn in the works of Josephus. The same name was preserved as Douka as late as the early monasteries founded in the 4th century and two small settlements near the springs at the base of the mountain continue to bear the name Duyūk. In Modern Hebrew, it is called Qarantal, after the Arabic name.

Christian traditions

In the Synoptic Gospels of the Christian Bible, after his baptism by John in the River Jordan, Jesus is said to have been driven by the Spirit into the "wilderness", where he fasted for 40 days and 40 nights before being tempted by the "devil" or "Satan". The account in Mark says as much in brief summary. The account in Matthew describes the devil tempting Jesus first with his ability to provide himself food to end his hunger, then traveling to the Temple in Jerusalem and tempting him with threatening suicide to prompt action from God's angels, and finally traveling to a high mountain and tempting him with dominion over all the kingdoms of the world with the attendant glory. On each occasion, Jesus refuses to misuse his power to sate human appetites, to misuse his position to test God's will, or to countenance worship of anyone other than God. The account in Luke is essentially the same, but the order of the last two temptations is reversed.

A separate tradition recorded in John Phocas's Ecphrasis, a 12th-century pilgrimage report, was that one of the tells at the base of the mount once held a temple commemorating the location where Joshua supposedly saw the archangel Michael.

History

Bronze Age to Hellenistic period
Jebel Quruntul is a limestone peak controlling the main paths from Jerusalem and Ramallah to Jericho and the River Jordan since antiquity, possibly the same as the "desert road" (derech hamidbar) mentioned in Joshua 8:15 & 20:31 and Judges 20:42. Nomads have frequented the oasis at Jericho produced by the Spring of Elisha at Ein as-Sultan for at least 12,000 years. There was small settlement on the slopes of Quruntul around 3200 during the early Bronze Age. The area was conquered by the Israelites around 1200, but there are no records of important battles in the area during the subsequent conquest by the Assyrians, Babylonians, Persians, Macedonians, or the Diadochi.

By the time of the Maccabean Revolt, the Seleucid general Bacchides had fortified the summit of Quruntul. This garrison fell to the Jewish revolt in 167, but was retaken and remanned by Bacchides following his victory at Elasa in 160. The emperor Antiochus VII Sidetes appointed a certain Ptolemy as commander of this garrison and the lands around Jericho. Using the fort as his main stronghold, he held a banquet there where he slew the Jewish high priest Simon Thassi, his father-in-law, along with two of his brothers-in-law in 134. Simon's third son John Hyrcanus then succeeded his father and attacked. Encircled by the Judean army, Ptolemy threatened to throw John's mother, his own mother-in-law, from the fort and over the cliff. The woman supposedly pled for her son not to shirk his duty on her account, after which he continued the assault. She was first tortured and then, after John was forced to withdraw from the siege to honor the seventh year of rest then observed by the Jews, killed. Receiving insufficient reinforcements from Antiochus to hold his position, Ptolemy then fled to Zeno Cotylas, the tyrant of Philadelphia (now Amman, Jordan).

Late Roman and Byzantine periods
At some point in late Antiquity, Jebel Quruntul became associated with the entire 40 days of fasting which preceded the temptation of Jesus and then with the temptation itself, which occurred on the "high mountain" from which he saw "all the kingdoms of the world and the glory of them". Tradition ascribed its "rediscovery" to StHelena, the pious mother of Constantine the Great, during her tour of the Holy Land sometime after 326. In 340, Chariton the Confessor established a lavra-type monastery on the mountain, then still using a form of its earlier Hebrew and Seleucid name. The lavra was not at the top of the mountain but beside the Grotto of the Temptation, the cave supposedly identified by Helen as the location of Jesus's 40 days of fasting. In all, 35 other cells were hollowed out on the east face of the mountain to house the monks. The wider area saw several other churches and monasteries erected over the next few centuries, most notably the monastery in Wadi Qelt, established by John of Thebes and made famous by George of Choziba. This initial period of Christian development came to an end with the 614 campaign of the ByzantineSasanian War, when the Persians were able to leverage a Jewish revolt to briefly conquer Jerusalem. The monasteries of Quruntul and Jericho were plundered and depopulated, recovery being prevented by the rapid Muslim conquest of Palestine in 635 and 636.

Early Muslim and Crusader periods
Relatively peaceful coexistence of Christians, Jews, and Muslims in the area ended in the 11th century with al-Hakim's persecutions, the invasions of the Seljuks, and the onset of the First Crusade. The Byzantine emperor ManuelI (r. 1143–1180) rebuilt the area's Orthodox monasteries. The two sites supposedly identified by StHelena centuries earlier, however, saw new Catholic chapels raised, and monks of the Holy Sepulchre used the site of Chariton's lavra beside the Grotto for a priory dedicated to John the Baptist, erected in 1133 or 1134. The relative importance of the Grotto and the priory led to the mountain itself becoming known to the numerous pilgrims of the era as "Mount Quarantine". The priory was granted the tithes of Jericho two years later. In 1143, this income was valued equivalent to 5,000 aurei ( of gold) per year and was transferred from the monks to the Sisters of Bethany by Queen Melisende of Jerusalem.

Around the same time, the Knights Templar constructed a small but formidable fortification on the mountaintop, storing water in Hellenistic cisterns and caches of weapons and supplies in the mountain's caves. It appears likely that the Templar stronghold made use of parts of the Hasmonean and Herodian walls, as well as a Byzantine chapel that had been erected within them. The order's Hierarchical Statutes from the 1170s or early 1180s charged the Commander at Jerusalem to always have ten knights available to reinforce the route past Jebel Quruntul and to protect and supply any noblemen who might travel it. Around the same time, Theodoric's Little Book reported that at least a few Templars or Hospitallers accompanied any group of pilgrims along the route against any local bandits or Bedouin raids. Burchard describes visiting Jebel Quruntul in his Description, but places the actual site of the Temptation at another location closer to Bethel. Wilbrand's Itinerary considered it genuine.

The area was lost to the Christians shortly after their 1187 defeat at Hattin to the Ayyubid sultan Saladin and largely depopulated.

Ottoman period
Exposed to continual Bedouin raiding, the area continued to languish under Ottoman rule. Writing in the early 18th century, the Dutch diplomat J.A. van Egmond reported that the local Arabs used the mountain's caves for protection and concealment. They had long forbidden Europeans to come near, but some of the Christian bishops in Palestine finally worked out an arrangement to pay them 10 silver kuruşlar a year for safe passage, after which pilgrims were again permitted to climb to the grotto and the top of the mountain with a local guide. Isolated travelers were sometimes robbed along the route but, in the case of a servant of a French ambassador to the area, the mutasarrif of Jerusalem personally intervened to force the area's village leaders to restore everything that had been stolen. Van Egmond noted the Fathers of the Holy Sepulchre he traveled with continued to believe the ruined chapel at the Grotto of the Temptation had been personally established by StHelena but its construction did not seem nearly so ancient to his eyes.

Modern times
Amid the weakening of the Ottoman Empire and the increasing assertiveness of European empires, Christian pilgrimage to the Holy Land began to rise in the late 19th century, alongside teams of archaeologists and missionaries. The monastery, now dedicated to St John the Baptist, was rebuilt from 1874 to 1904, its care being given to Greek Orthodox monks in 1905. Following World WarI, Britain's League of Nations mandate over Palestine saw modern irrigation systems introduced to the area around Jericho, which prospered as a center of fruit harvesting. The chaos around the creation of Israel, the Palestinian exodus, and subsequent wars and conflict limited access, tourism, and economic development in the area although Jordan's King Hussein welcomed archaeological work, in part to undermine Israeli claims that the area had been primarily Jewish for most of its history. A 2002 excavation in the caves of Jebel Quruntul found that one had been used for burials from the Chalcolithic to the Islamic Age.

In 1998, during the period of relative peace following the Oslo Accords, Palestinian businessman Marwan Sinokrot constructed a  12-cabin cable car from the ruins of ancient Jericho to the Greek monastery, capable of carrying up to 625 people an hour in preparation for an expected influx of tourists during the millennium celebrations of the year 2000. Religious tourism makes up over 60% of Jericho's total visitors (estimated at 300,000 people per year in 2015), and the aerial lift cut the time to reach the monastery from as long as 90 minutes to as little as 5. The company secured recognition from the Guinness Book of World Records as "the longest cable car aerial tramway below sea level" but the Second Intifada began shortly thereafter, again limiting tourism in the area. The project also ran into difficulty with the mountain's monks, who had not been consulted about the project and sometimes shut the monastery doors to groups of tourists, but continues to operate. Jebel Quruntul, its fortress, and its monastery form part of the El-Bariyah "Wilderness" area proposed for World Heritage status in 2012 and were included in the Jericho Oasis Archaeological Park established with Italian help in 2014.

Legacy
An account of Christ's Temptation under the name "Mount Quarantania" forms part of Henry Wadsworth Longfellow's poem Christus: A Mystery.

Alternative locations of biblical site
The "high mountain" of the biblical narrative has sometimes been identified with other locations in Roman Palestine. A local Arab tradition placed it as late as the 19th century at the lower peak of 'Ushsh el-Ghurab at the northern end of the Jericho Plain, separated from the Mount of Temptation by the valley known as Wadi ed-Duyuk. Another tradition recorded in Ernoul's 13th-century chronicle placed the Devil's offer of dominion over the kingdoms of the world at Mount Precipice just south of Nazareth, where Jesus was separately said to have disappeared from a crowd during one of his rejections by the Jewish community of his time.

See also
Jericho
Monastery of the Temptation
Tell es-Sultan

References

Citations

Bibliography

.
.
.
.
.
.
.
.
.
.

.
.
. 

.
.
.
.
.
.
.
.
.
.

Further reading

Mythological places
Temptation
Temptation
Judaean Desert
Castles and fortifications of the Knights Templar
Temptation of Christ
Life of Jesus in the New Testament